The Safa Mosque is a historical mosque in Isfahan, Iran. The mosque was built by Mohammad Golestaneh in the Qajar era and is located near the Shahshahan mausoleum.

See also 
List of the historical structures in the Isfahan province

References 

19th-century mosques
Mosques in Isfahan